Velothon Stockholm is a cycling race held annually in Sweden. It is part of UCI Europe Tour in category 1.1. It is part of the UCI Velothon Majors series of races organised by Lagardère Unlimited, which also includes Velothon Berlin, Velothon Wales and Velothon Vienna. These events are characterised by mass-participation sportives before an elite race along a lengthened route.

Winners

References

Cycle races in Sweden
2015 establishments in Sweden
Recurring sporting events established in 2015
UCI Europe Tour races